Kobian is a robot created by scientists at Waseda University in Japan. It is capable of displaying expressions of emotion and was developed to realize culture-specific greetings. It can also simulate human speech including the movement of the lips and the oscillations of the head.  

Kobian is based on the WABIAN-2R robot and the emotion expression humanoid robot called WE-4RII and is 1,470 mm tall and weighs 62 kilograms. The robot's two eyeballs are outfitted with CMOS cameras. It is a bi-pedal standalone robot with control units such as motor drivers placed in the robotic head, making this particular part larger than the human head. The robotic head for the Kobian-R, the newer and more downsized version of the robot, has 24 degrees of freedom (DoFs) and a blue facial color due to an electro luminescence sheet. The original Kobian robot has a DoF of 48. Two versions of the Kobian-Rs have been built - a Western and a Japanese variant - to develop the system that produces the robot's facial cues. 

The Kobian robot has another version called Debian, which has a slightly different facial and body color to provide these robots distinctions when interacting with each other and with other subjects. The color has no cultural significance.

See also
 Robotics

References

External links
 A robot displaying human emotion has been unveiled, By Emma Barnett, Technology and Digital Media Correspondent, UK Telegraph, 23 Jun 2009.

Bipedal humanoid robots
Social robots
Robots of Japan
2000s robots